SKA Odesa (Society with a limited liability "Football club SKA") was a Ukrainian associated football club based in Odesa, Ukraine from 2011 until February 2013. The club was named as SKA Odessa out of nostalgic feelings for the past Soviet football club out of Odessa. The Professional Football League of Ukraine informed that the Ukrainian club cannot claim its heritage to it.

History
The club was founded in 2011 under a memorial name of SKA Odesa, which is a name for the Soviet Army football club of the Odessa Military District that used to compete in the Soviet competitions (1944–1992) and later as a city team SK Odesa in the Ukrainian competitions (1992–1999).

The current (former) club was formed in 2010 by former players and training staff of the Soviet team. The team began competing in the Odesa City League competition advancing to the Odesa Oblast completion. In 2012 the team participated in the Ukrainian Amateur competition (4th Level) placing last in its group and applied to rejoin the PFL.

The club was competing in the Ukrainian Second League in the 2012–13 season. In February 2013 the club dissolved itself due to lack of sufficient funding after again finishing last in its group.

{|class="wikitable"
|-bgcolor="#efefef"
! Season
! Div.
! Pos
! Pl.
! W
! D
! L
! GS
! GA
! P
!Domestic Cup
!colspan=2|Europe
!Notes
|-
|align=center|2012
|align=center|4th
|align=center|7
|align=center|12
|align=center|1
|align=center|1
|align=center|10
|align=center|6
|align=center|19
|align=center|4
|align=center|
|align=center|
|align=center|
|align=center|
|-
|align=center|2012–13
|align=center|3rd "A"
|align=center|11
|align=center|20
|align=center|4
|align=center|2
|align=center|14
|align=center|17
|align=center|33
|align=center|14
|align=center|1/64 finals
|align=center|
|align=center|
|align=center|withdrew
|}

See also
 SKA-Lotto Odesa

References

External links
 Official website

Association football clubs established in 2011
2011 establishments in Ukraine
Football clubs in Odesa
2013 disestablishments in Ukraine
Association football clubs disestablished in 2013
Defunct football clubs in Ukraine